Bareh Anar (also Romanized as Bareh Anār, Bareh-ye Anār, and Berah Anār; also known as Bara Anār, Bard Anār, and Bard-e Anār) is a village in Boluran Rural District, Darb-e Gonbad District, Kuhdasht County, Lorestan Province, Iran. At the 2006 census, its population was 182, in 32 families.

References 

Towns and villages in Kuhdasht County